National Alopecia Areata Foundation based in San Rafael, California is dedicated to the discovery of a cure or treatment for alopecia areata and supporting the conditions victims. It was founded in 1981.

Bree Morse, Miss California 2015, based her pageant-winning platform on support for this foundation.

References 

Medical and health organizations based in California
Organizations based in Marin County, California
San Rafael, California